Ruy may refer to:

Arts and Entertainment
Ruy, the Little Cid, Spanish animated television series
Ruy Blas, a character in the eponymous tragic drama by Victor Hugo

People
another form of Rui, a Portuguese male given name
another form of the Spanish male given name Rodrigo
Ruy López de Segura (1530-1580), Spanish chess player
Ruy Ramos (born 1957), Japanese footballer
Ruy (footballer) (born 1989), Brazilian footballer

Places
Ruy, Isère, a commune in France
Ruy, Iran, a city in Iran
Ruy Special Town, a village in Iran
Ruy Mountain, a mountain on the border of Bulgaria and Serbia

Other uses
Ruy Lopez, a chess opening named after the Spanish chess player